Raphael Hess is an Anglican bishop: since 2006 he has been the inaugural Bishop of Saldanha Bay.

Notes 

21st-century Anglican Church of Southern Africa bishops
Anglican bishops of Saldanha Bay
Living people
Year of birth missing (living people)